Paul Jorgensen (April 5, 1935 – August 6, 2008) was a super featherweight professional boxer from Louisiana.

Personal life
Jorgenson was born in Tallulah, Louisiana and made his residence in Port Arthur, Texas.

Professional career
Jorgensen made his professional debut on April 27, 1954 with a four-round points win against Infant Valdez in Houston, Texas.  Jorgensen won his first sixteen fights, including a win against Eddie Bertolino on June 1, 1954.  It was in the rematch against Bertolino on September 28, 1954 that Jorgensen suffered his first loss.  Like many boxers of his day, Jorgensen fought frequently - often twice a month.  Jorgensen continued to fight and generally to win, facing tough competition like Redtop Davis, Lulu Perez, Jackie Blair, Carmelo Costa, Victor Manuel Quijano, Harold Gomes, and Battling Torres.  Jorgensen retired after a losing to Battling Torres on September 6, 1960.  Jorgensen managed to cram an amazing number of fights (93) in a relatively short career (7½ years).  His final record was 81 wins (35 by knockout), 8 losses, and 4 draws. Jorgensen died August 6, 2008 in Port Arthur, Texas.

Notes

Boxers from Louisiana
2008 deaths
1935 births
People from Tallulah, Louisiana
American male boxers
Super-featherweight boxers